Juvé y Camps is a family-owned Cava producer, headquartered in Sant Sadurní d'Anoia, Catalonia.  Juvé y Camps  was founded in 1921 by Joan Juvé Baqués and his wife Teresa Camps Ferrer. The winery has 2700 acres of vineyards.

Similar Cava winery groups include Freixenet  and Codorníu.

Wine criticism
Robert Parker's Wine Advocate rated 91 points for the Juvé & Camps non-vintage brut sparkling rosé.
Review aggregator site wine.com rates the Juvé y Camps non-vintage brut sparkling rosé at 4.1 on a 5-point scale;
 it is a single varietal pinot noir produced in the traditional method.

Review aggregator site wine.com rates the Juvé & Camps 2016 vintage brut nature gran reserva Cava  at 4.3 on a 5-point scale.

References

External links

1921 establishments in Spain
Companies based in Catalonia
Spanish brands
Sparkling wines
Wineries of Spain